The Tanzania Commission for AIDS (TACAIDS) is the Tanzanian government organization assigned with the task of coordinating Tanzania's response to the HIV/AIDS epidemic.

TACAIDS was established on 1 December 2000 in an announcement by President Benjamin Mkapa.

Reginald Mengi is a former commissioner of TACAIDS.

See also 
 National AIDS Control Programme

External links
 Tanzania Commission for AIDS

Reference

HIV/AIDS in Africa
Medical and health organisations based in Tanzania
Government of Tanzania